Oluwafemi Junior Ajayi (born 29 January 1996), commonly known as Junior Ajayi, is a Nigerian professional footballer who plays as a striker for Egyptian Premier League club Smouha.

He was selected by Nigeria for their 18-man squad for the 2016 Summer Olympics, after helping them qualifying to Rio with his decisive goals. With Nigeria, he won the Olympic bronze medal. Junior Ajayi helped Egyptian giants Al Ahly to secure 2 CAF Champion Leagues, 2019-20 and 2020-21. However, following the arrival of Percy Tau and Luis Miquissone, he was never selected by Pitso Mosimane for matches and demanded Al Ahly to terminate his contract. He eventually found himself in Libyan side Al Nasr-Benghazi. On July 30 2022, Junior Ajayi returned to Egypt by signing for Alexandria based Smouha SC

Club career

CS Sfaxien
Junior Ajayi ELFnan joined Tunisian Sfaxien club in September 2015, he participated in 28 matches in the Tunisian league  with a rate of 2388 minutes, scored 10 goals and made seven goals and was punished twice with the yellow card, wearing the number 11 with Tunisian Sfaxien and the same number with the Nigeria Olympic team.

Al Ahly SC
Al Ahly has officially signed a contract with him during the summer transfer period to be the second player to join the red team from CS Sfaxien after Ali Maâloul, for  $2,500,000, he scored four goals in ten matches.

Al Nasr-Benghazi
Following the termination of Junior Ajayi’s contract by Al Ahly Junior Ajayi became a free agent and signed for Libyan side Al Nasr Benghazi on a free transfer.

Smouha SC
Egypt’s Alexandria based Smouha SC secured the signing of Junior Ajayi on a 3 year contract, becoming the second Egyptian club for the Nigerian striker to play at.

Honours

Al Ahly

 Egyptian Premier League: 2016–17, 2017–18, 2018–19, 2019–20
 Egypt Cup: 2016–17, 2019–20
 Egyptian Super Cup: 2017, 2018
 CAF Champions League: 2019–20, 2020–21
 CAF Super Cup: 2021

Nigeria 

 Olympic Bronze Medal: 2016

References

External links

Living people
Nigerian footballers
Nigeria international footballers
Association football forwards
Shooting Stars S.C. players
CS Sfaxien players
Nigerian expatriate footballers
Nigerian expatriate sportspeople in Tunisia
Expatriate footballers in Tunisia
2015 Africa U-23 Cup of Nations players
Footballers at the 2016 Summer Olympics
Olympic footballers of Nigeria
Medalists at the 2016 Summer Olympics
Olympic bronze medalists for Nigeria
Olympic medalists in football
Tunisian Ligue Professionnelle 1 players
Al Ahly SC players
Expatriate footballers in Egypt
Nigerian expatriate sportspeople in Egypt
Egyptian Premier League players
1996 births
African Games bronze medalists for Nigeria
African Games medalists in football
Competitors at the 2015 African Games